The Severnside derby is a local derby in football in the United Kingdom between Welsh club Cardiff City and either of the English clubs, Bristol City or Bristol Rovers. Alternatively, it may be between Newport County and either of the Bristol-based clubs.

Reasons for the rivalry
Although it is a traditional local rivalry, it is different in that it also crosses the Wales–England border, increasing somewhat the hostility between the two teams. As well as bragging rights the matches are seen as an "international contest". Both sets of fans use this to taunt each other with patriotic songs.

In the Football Fans census in 2003 about football rivalries, Bristol City and Cardiff were listed as 10th and 13th in the UK respectively in a list of teams.

Violence
Both teams' fans have a history of hooliganism and have their own hooligan firm: Cardiff's being the Soul Crew and Bristol City with the City Service Firm. Due to the fierce rivalry and the history of the two teams the encounters can end up with some sort of conflict, commonly pre-organised.

In an attempt to discourage the violence, games between the two are usually kept "all coach", meaning that everyone travelling to an away game must travel using the club's official transport and therefore no one can travel to the game of their own accord. The coaches are usually accompanied by a heavy police presence and away fans tend to be kept in the ground after the game until the home fans have all left. While this has been mildly successful in stopping organised fights, fans still attempt to attack each other by throwing objects such as bottles and coins during the game.

The violence involved with this derby was featured in a BBC documentary in 2001, Hooligans. In the programme a reporter wearing a hidden camera infiltrated the Soul Crew, exposing the use of racist chanting and abuse as well as a lack of control by stewards and police.

Notable characters in past encounters

Unlike the South Wales derby, and the Bristol derby, it is not usually frowned upon to sign a player or manager who has played for the opposition in the Severnside Derby. The only players that are disfavoured are players who are remembered for one-off incidents.

Such players include former Bristol City player Lee Trundle, who is hated by Cardiff fans for a long affiliation with rivals Swansea City. After winning the LDV Vans Trophy in 2006, Trundle took to the pitch wearing a T-shirt depicting a Swansea fan urinating on a Cardiff City shirt. He also held up a Flag of Wales with the words "Fuck off Cardiff" on it but claimed he did not realise it was written on there.

Head-to-head record

Current as of 4th March 2023 Statistics obtained from Soccerbase.

Game list

See also
Cultural relationship between the Welsh and the English

References

Game References

External links
Official Football League Preview magazine
Soccerbase.com Head to Head Bristol C vs. Cardiff
Soccerbase.com Head to Head Bristol R vs. Cardiff

England football derbies
Wales football derbies
Cardiff City F.C.
Bristol City F.C.
Bristol Rovers F.C.
Newport County A.F.C.